Wanbi is a town and locality in the Australian state of South Australia located  about  east of the state capital of Adelaide and about  north-east of the municipal seat of Karoonda.

Wanbi is on the Karoonda Highway and the Loxton railway line. It was passed in 1912 by the Barmera railway line and became the junction where the Moorook railway line branched off in 1925. The contraction of railways in South Australia in the 1980s meant that both of these broad gauge lines closed, except for the branch towards Loxton which was shortened to Tookayerta and converted to standard gauge. That line also ceased to be used from July 2015.

The first stop after Wanbi on the Moorook railway line was Gluyas which was just the Wanbi side of what is now the boundary between the Wanbi and Caliph bounded localities. No infrastructure remains at the site.

The 2016 Australian census which was conducted in August 2016 reported that Wanbi had a population of 44 people.

References

Towns in South Australia